

Results 
Scores and results list Scotland's points tally first.

See also
 History of rugby union matches between New Zealand and Scotland

References

Scotland rugby union tour
Scotland national rugby union team tours
Rugby union tours of New Zealand
Scottish-New Zealand culture
tour
tour